New Cassel is a hamlet and census-designated place (CDP) in the Town of North Hempstead in Nassau County, on Long Island, in New York, United States. The population was 14,059 at the 2010 census, representing a net gain of 761 over the 2000 census.

History 
When the adjacent village of Westbury incorporated in 1932, New Cassel chose not to be absorbed over fears that taxes would rise. As such, it would remain an unincorporated hamlet directly governed by the Town of North Hempstead in Manhasset.

Geography

Demographics

As of the census of 2000, there were 13,298 people, 2,972 households, and 2,448 families residing in the CDP. The population density was 9,072.8 per square mile (3,492.8/km2). There were 3,067 housing units at an average density of 2,092.5/sq mi (805.6/km2). The racial makeup of the CDP was 31.64% White, 47.32% African American, 0.45% Native American, 1.41% Asian, 0.05% Pacific Islander, 12.59% from other races, and 6.55% from two or more races. Hispanic or Latino of any race were 41.11% of the population.

There were 2,972 households, out of which 40.6% had children under the age of 18 living with them, 50.2% were married couples living together, 22.9% had a female householder with no husband present, and 17.6% were non-families. 12.7% of all households were made up of individuals, and 7.0% had someone living alone who was 65 years of age or older. The average household size was 4.46 and the average family size was 4.40.

In the CDP, the population was spread out, with 28.9% under the age of 18, 12.3% from 18 to 24, 32.7% from 25 to 44, 17.6% from 45 to 64, and 8.5% who were 65 years of age or older. The median age was 30 years. For every 100 females, there were 99.0 males. For every 100 females age 18 and over, there were 98.1 males.

The median income for a household in the CDP was $71,270, and the median income for a family was $69,044. Males had a median income of $22,526 versus $28,193 for females. The per capita income for the CDP was $15,673. About 10.5% of families and 14.8% of the population were below the poverty line, including 19.5% of those under age 18 and 13.7% of those age 65 or over.

As of 2010, the population was 14,019. The demographics were as follows:
 Hispanic - 7,577 (53.9%)
 Black alone - 5,225 (37.2%)
 White alone - 841 (6.0%)
 Two or more races - 187 (1.3%)
 Asian alone - 174 (1.2%)
 Other race alone - 44 (0.3%)
 American Indian alone - 10 (0.07%)
 Native Hawaiian and Other Pacific Islander alone - 1 (0.01%)

Parks and recreation 
The Town of North Hempstead operates two park and recreational facilities in New Cassel:

 Martin "Bunky" Reid Park
 "Yes We Can" Community Center

Transportation

Although the Long Island Rail Road tracks bisect the town, there is no stop in the hamlet. A station existed briefly during the 19th century, and the western portion of the community is within walking distance of the Westbury station. As such, the northern portion of New Cassel is served by the n22 and n22X routes along Prospect Avenue, while the southern portion is served by the N24 along Old Country Road. All of those routes travel between Hicksville and Jamaica.

References

Town of North Hempstead, New York
Census-designated places in New York (state)
Hamlets in New York (state)
Census-designated places in Nassau County, New York
Hamlets in Nassau County, New York